Half-Life: Full Life Consequences is a 4-episode Machinima series animated within the video game Garry's Mod and published on the video sharing website YouTube. Based on a fan fiction work of the same name, the series follows the exploits of the character "John Freeman", the unknown brother of Gordon Freeman from the Half-Life video game series. The first episode in the series was uploaded on January 23, 2008 by user Djy1991. The fourth and last episode was uploaded May 23, 2009. The series was praised for its humor and ability to elevate its poorly written source material.

Format 
Each episode is adapted from a corresponding story by fan fiction author Squirrelking that was posted on the website FanFiction.net. The original text of the story is narrated over video captured in the game Garry's Mod, often with accompanying music and sound effects. Each episode is voiced by a different narrator, each credited by an online handle.

Reception and legacy 
The series was well received by viewers. Within a week after uploading, episode one was featured by several well-established internet magazines and blogs such as Destructoid, Kotaku, and Boing Boing. Video game journalist Justin McElroy praised it as "an awesome piece of classic fan fiction written by a nine-year-old and then animated by a group of evil geniuses." Within a year it had received over 1 million views. The popularity of Half-Life: Full Life Consequences inspired other spinoff works, many adapting other Squirrelking fan fiction.

Although the fan fiction author Squirrelking was often cited as being a young child, it was later revealed to be a hoax account with the goal of making something "so mind-numbingly bad that it stands the test of time as one of the worst things ever written."

In 2019, the series was showcased during the 12 Days of Garry's Mod event on the official Garry's Mod website.

Episodes

References

External links
 

2000s YouTube series
Fan fiction works
Half-Life (series)
Machinima works
Parodies of video games